Okalongo Constituency is an electoral constituency in the Omusati Region of Namibia on the border to Angola. It has a population of 30,500 and an average household size of 6.30 people.  Okalongo had 16,031 registered voters. The constituency's capital is the settlement of Okalongo. Other villages within the constituency include Onandjaba, Omatwadiva, Onaidjimba, Okafitu Kauvale, Olwiili, Ongolo, Ondudu, Onembaba, Ondobe Yehumba, Ondobe Yefidi, Ohakapeke, Olupandu, Epoko, Olupito, Oupale, Oshuundje, Okathitu Konghai, Oikango, Onalumbololo, Uushwa, Orange ya Nashimbuli, Omutundungu, Oshiteyatemo, Aanongo, Ombwana, Eshwa la Hamukwaya and Onambome.

Politics
As in all constituencies in Omusati, SWAPO won the 2015 regional election by a landslide. Laurentius Iipinge gained 6,923 votes, while Simson Nangolo of the Democratic Turnhalle Alliance (DTA) gained only 80. Councillor Iipinge (SWAPO) was reelected in the 2020 regional election. He obtained 5,667 votes, far ahead of Josua Mwetupunga of the Independent Patriots for Change (IPC, an opposition party formed in August 2020), who obtained 1,281 votes.

Education
Okalongo Constituency primary schools include Lucas Damascus Primary School, Ondeipanda Primary School, Ouvale Primary School, St Gabriel Primary School, Elao Primary school and Eshakeno Primary School. Secondary schools include Haudano Senior Secondary School and Tomas Tutaleni Senior Secondary School. Other schools include Oshaaluwata Combined School, Onembaba Combined School, John Shekundja Combined School, Onkambadhala Combined school, Epoko Combined School, Oshatotwa Combined School, and Sheetekela Combined School.

References

Constituencies of Omusati Region
States and territories established in 1992
1992 establishments in Namibia